Lien Hillewaert (born 27 November 1997) is a Belgian field hockey player for the Belgian national team.

She participated at the 2018 Women's Hockey World Cup.

References

External links 
 

1997 births
Living people
Belgian female field hockey players
Female field hockey defenders